This is a list of Cypriot football transfers for the 2010–11 winter transfer window by club. Only transfers by clubs of the Cypriot First Division and Cypriot Second Division are included.

The winter transfer window opened on 1 January 2011, although a few transfers took place prior to that date. The window closed at midnight on 31 January 2011. Players without a club may join one at any time, either during or in between transfer windows.

Marfin Laiki League

AEK Larnaca

In:

Out:

AEL Limassol

In:

Out:

AEP Paphos

In:

Out:

Alki Larnaca

In:

Out:

Anorthosis

In:

Out:

APOEL

In:

Out:

Apollon Limassol

In:

Out:

APOP Kinyras Peyias

In:

Out:

Doxa Katokopia

In:

Out:

Enosis Neon Paralimni

In:

Out:

Ermis Aradippou

In:

Out:

Ethnikos Achna

In:

Out:

Olympiakos Nicosia

In:

Out:

Omonia

In:

Out:

Cypriot Second Division

Adonis Idaliou

In:

Out:

Akritas Chlorakas

In:

Out:

Anagennisi Deryneia

In:

Out:

APEP Pitsilia

In:

Out:

Aris Limassol

In:

Out:

ASIL

In:

Out:

Atromitos Yeroskipou

In:

Out:

Chalkanoras Idaliou

In:

Out:

Digenis Akritas Morphou

In:

Out:

Nea Salamina

In:

Out:

Omonia Aradippou

In:

Out:

Onisilos Sotira

In:

Out:

Othellos Athienou F.C.

In:

Out:

PAEEK FC

In:

Out:

References

See also

Cypriot
Transfers
2010-11